The 2015–16 season is the 91st season in Rayo’s history and the 17th in the top-tier.

Current squad

Out on loan

Staff
Head coach:
Paco Jémez
Director of football:
Felipe Miñambres

Competitions

Overall

Overview

La Liga

League table

Results summary

Result round by round

Matches

See also
2015–16 La Liga

References

Rayo Vallecano seasons
Spanish football clubs 2015–16 season